Đorđe Babalj (born May 3, 1981) is a Serbian retired football goalkeeper.

Club career
Born in Sarajevo (in Bosnia and Herzegovina), he moved with his parents to Apatin (in Serbia) as a child. He started his youth career playing for local team FK Mladost Apatin.

After three years he signed his first professional contract for the same football club and remained faithful to this club for 11 years. He contributed in placing Mladost in the First League of FR Yugoslavia twice, which was the greatest achievement of that club until then in its history. At that time, he was invited to the U-19 Serbia and Montenegro national team, but only played two matches during his year as its member. In the summer of 2006 he left Mladost and the following two years he played for FK Vojvodina from Novi Sad, and FK Borac Čačak in the Serbian SuperLiga, following also spells abroad with Hungarian Zalaegerszegi TE and Bosnian FK Laktaši. In the summer of 2009, he joined Iranian team Shahrdari Tabriz F.C. During the winter break of the 2011–12 season, he returned to Serbia by signing with his former team FK Borac Čačak.

References

External links
 Djordje Babalj Official website
 Đorđe Babalj at Utakmica.rs

1981 births
Living people
Footballers from Sarajevo
Serbs of Bosnia and Herzegovina
Bosnia and Herzegovina emigrants to Serbia
Yugoslav Wars refugees
Association football goalkeepers
Serbia and Montenegro footballers
Serbian footballers
Bosnia and Herzegovina footballers
FK Mladost Apatin players
FK Vojvodina players
FK Borac Čačak players
Zalaegerszegi TE players
FK Laktaši players
Shahrdari Tabriz players
First League of Serbia and Montenegro players
Serbian SuperLiga players
Nemzeti Bajnokság I players
Premier League of Bosnia and Herzegovina players
Azadegan League players
Serbian expatriate footballers
Expatriate footballers in Hungary
Serbian expatriate sportspeople in Hungary
Expatriate footballers in Iran
Serbian expatriate sportspeople in Iran